Roberto Rodríguez (born 3 January 1951) is a Cuban water polo player. He competed in the men's tournament at the 1968 Summer Olympics.

References

1951 births
Living people
Cuban male water polo players
Olympic water polo players of Cuba
Water polo players at the 1968 Summer Olympics
Sportspeople from Camagüey